Brian Eduardo Figueroa Flores  (born 28 May 1999) is a Mexican professional footballer who plays as a winger for Liga MX club UNAM.

Career

Youth career
Figueroa at a young age was scouted and joined Pumas youth academy in 2011. He then continued through Pumas Youth Academy successfully going through U-13, U-15, U-17 and U-20. Until finally receiving attention to join the first team, Francisco Palencia being the coach promoting Figueroa to the first team.

Pumas UNAM
Figueroa made his professional debut in the Liga MX on the 23 of July 2017. He started with the first team which ended in a 1–0 Win against Pachuca.

Honours
Atlante
Liga de Expansión MX: Apertura 2021
Campeón de Campeones: 2022

References

External links
 
 Milenio-Figueroa Raising (Spanish)
 Record MX-Pumas Figueroa Debut (Spanish)
 

1999 births
Living people
Footballers from Mexico City
Association football midfielders
Mexican footballers
Club Universidad Nacional footballers
Liga MX players